Elements of Semiology is a compendium-like text by French semiotician Roland Barthes, originally published under the title of "Éléments de Sémiologie" in the French review Communications (No. 4, 1964, pp. 91–135). The English translation by Annette Lavers and Colin Smith has been published independently as a short book.

In the slightly expanded introduction to the book, Barthes suggests that although linguist Ferdinand de Saussure conceived of linguistics as a branch of semiology, semiology should rather be seen as a branch of linguistics.

See also
Cape Editions

External links
First half of the book Elements of Semiology at marxists.org

Books in semiotics
1964 non-fiction books
Structuralism
French literary criticism
Books by Roland Barthes
Books of literary criticism